Michael Mario Andretti (born October 5, 1962) is an American semi-retired auto racing driver and current team owner.  Statistically one of the most successful drivers in the history of American open-wheel car racing, Andretti won the 1991 CART PPG Indy Car World Series and amassed 42 race victories, the most in the CART era and fourth-most all time.  Since his retirement from active racing, Andretti has owned Andretti Autosport, which has won four IndyCar Series championships and five Indianapolis 500 races.

He is the son of Formula One World Champion and Indianapolis 500 winner Mario Andretti, and the father of current IndyCar Series driver Marco Andretti.

Racing career

Early career
Michael Andretti was born in Bethlehem, Pennsylvania in the Lehigh Valley region of eastern Pennsylvania to race car driver Mario Andretti, a four-time IndyCar champion and one-time Formula One champion, and his wife Dee Ann (née Hoch)

Following a successful career racing karts, winning 50 of his 75 races over eight years, Andretti moved into racing cars. He obtained his SCCA National License in 1980, then won six races to claim the SCCA's Northeast Division Formula Ford championship in 1981. He also drove in a number of Formula Vee races in regional SCCA events. In 1982, he won six of the 11 races on his way to winning the Robert Bosch US Formula Super Vee Championship. He also won the opening race of the 1983 Super Vee season before he moved up to drive in Formula Atlantic, and won his second title by winning the FIA Formula Mondial North American Cup the following season. Although he made his international sports car debut at the 1982 24 Hours of Le Mans, he was denied the opportunity to race, as the Mirage M12 he had chosen to race with his father was disqualified 80 minutes before the race was due to start. The father and son partnership returned to the Circuit de la Sarthe the following year, and were joined by Philippe Alliot in the Porsche Kremer Racing's Porsche 956, taking third place. Andretti also raced alongside his father in the Riverside 6 Hours where they were joined by A. J. Foyt and Preston Henn, but the Porsche 935 failed to finish. The father and son duo paired up again the 1984 24 Hours of Daytona, this time in a full-works Porsche 962, which made its race debut. They took pole position, but during the race, the engine broke.

CART

Andretti made his CART debut in 1983, racing for the Kraco Enterprises team. He re-signed for Kraco for the 1984 season, where he managed five third-place finishes and ended his rookie season in seventh overall. In the Indianapolis 500, he finished fifth and shared the Rookie of the Year award with Roberto Guerrero. He went on to win his first IndyCar race in 1986 in the Toyota Grand Prix of Long Beach. The season became a two-man battle for the championship title, between Michael and Bobby Rahal. Andretti would take the points lead with his victory on the Milwaukee Mile. A week later, on Father's Day, Michael was leading on the final lap at Portland, when his March-Cosworth 86C ran out of fuel, allowing his father, Mario, to beat him by just 0.07 seconds. It was one of the most shocking finishes in the history of IndyCar, and the closest finish until 1997. With Rahal continuing to win races, Andretti's consistent finishing only allowed Rahal a nine-point lead in the standing with two races remaining. Andretti won a key victory in at Phoenix. Going into the season finale at Tamiami Park, Andretti was just three points behind Rahal, but neither driver were a factor in the race, with Andretti retiring with a broken halfshaft.

In a one-off race with Alfa Corse, he took part in the inaugural World Touring Car race, 500 km di Monza. Paired with Alessandro Nannini, they finished 16th overall, second in class. Back in CART, he continued with Kraco in 1987, and like 1986, the championship was between Andretti and Rahal. Michael would win the Michigan 500, drawing within nine points of Rahal.  With him winning in dominating fashion at Nazareth Speedway, his championship hopes remained alive, although Rahal clinched the championship at the next race. Andretti would also win the season finale, Tamiami Park. He would finish runner-up for the second season in a row. Back in June 1987, Michael joined Hendrick Motorsport to race a Chevrolet Corvette GTP in the Mid-Ohio 500 km, this time joined by his cousin, John Andretti, where they finished 11th.

Following Porsche's defeat in the 1988 Daytona 24 Hours, Porsche entered a 962C at Le Mans for Mario, Michael and John. They were tremendously competitive in the first half of the race, until the Andretti family's car needed minor repairs before lapsing on to five cylinders, finishing sixth overall. Michael and Mario join Busby Racing for 1989 Daytona 24 Hours, only for their 962 to retire with brakes problems.

The 1988 CART season was a lean year for Michael. He remained with Kraco and won only a single race, the Marlboro Challenge, for which no championship points were awarded.

For the 1989 season, Andretti signed with Newman/Haas Racing, partnering him with his father. He won two races that season, Molson Indy Toronto and the Marlboro 500 at the Michigan International Speedway, placing third in points. For 1990, Al Unser Jr. would become champion, Andretti was his nearest competitor, winning five races and four poles. In the second-to-last race of the season at Nazareth, Unser crashed out, giving Andretti a huge opportunity to close the gap. Andretti managed only a sixth-place finish, and could not capitalize on Unser's misfortune. Unser left Nazareth with a 27-point lead, enough to clinch the championship. Andretti would finish runner-up once again.

For the 1991 24 Hours of Daytona, Mario was joined by both Michael and his Mario's younger son, Jeff Andretti. Piloting a Jochen Dauer Racing entered Porsche 962, they were classified fifth overall, despite not finishing the race.

Andretti was the drivers' champion of the 1991 CART PPG Indy Car World Series. He won a total eight of 17 races, eight poles and led more than half of the laps during the season, but Rahal still took the championship battle down to the final race of the season. Andretti's season started slowly, recording DNFs in the opening two events, then the heartbreaking second place at the Indy 500. He recovered from this, winning four of the last five races of the season and with Rahal retiring during the title decider at Laguna Seca, he cruised to the title. The day before, he won the non-championship, Marlboro Challenge for a second time.

Remaining with Newman/Haas for 1992, Michael's season started slowly, but then wins three races out of four mid-season. Despite taking two more wins later in the year, including the season finale at Laguna Seca, Rahal beat him again to the title by just four points. He would leave for F1 at the end of the year, with his seat going to the reigning Formula One World Champion, Nigel Mansell, who would win the 1993 CART title in his rookie season.

For four seasons between 1989 and 1992, Michael had his father as his teammate at Newman/Haas. Together, they established a number of firsts, including the first father-son front row, for the 1986 Dana 200 for Special Olympics at Phoenix, and the first of 15 father-son podiums in the 1984 Cribari Wines 300K at Laguna Seca, with the last coming nearly a decade later in the 1992 Daikyo IndyCar Grand Prix, around the street of Surfers Paradise.

Futility at Indianapolis

The Andretti family's bad luck at the Indianapolis Motor Speedway is known as the Andretti Curse. He shared Rookie of the Year honours with Guerrero in 1984, when he finished fifth. However, in 1991, he led with 12 laps remaining, but finished second to Rick Mears after battling the multiple Indy 500 winner. The pair of them traded memorable late-lap outside passes for the lead in Turn One. The next year, 1992, he dominated the race, leading four-fifths of the laps, but, with 11 laps remaining after holding a two-lap lead, his fuel pump failed, and his car coasted to a stop. He was classified in 13th place. He also dropped out while leading the Indy 500 in 1989, 1995 and 2003. Andretti holds the record for most laps led in the Indy 500 without having achieved a victory.

Formula One

For the 1993 season, Michael signed for Marlboro McLaren, to partner with the triple World Drivers' Champion Ayrton Senna in their Ford HBD V8-powered MP4/8. He signed during the summer of 1992 and the deal was announced at Monza over the weekend of the 1992 Italian Grand Prix.

"I think he can win Grands Prix and become the World Champion," said Ron Dennis, McLaren's team principal. "It's not a question of which country you come from. It's how you demonstrate your desire to win." There were practical factors that mitigated against Andretti being able to show competitive form in his debut season in F1. The rule changes introduced that season destroyed his hopes of unrestricted laps in free practice during which he could learn the tracks, as most were unfamiliar to him. From the start of 1993, just 23 laps were allowed in the morning's untimed session and only twelve in the qualifying session.

With the pressure intensifying, Michael began the year with crashes in the Kyalami and at Interlagos. In the latter of these two, he had a massive collision at the start with Gerhard Berger in a Ferrari. He then qualified sixth for the Sega European Grand Prix at Donington Park, but he collided with Karl Wendlinger's Sauber on the opening lap. Next time out at Imola, he again fell foul of Wendlinger after a drive that might have ended with a visit to the podium, and many critics cited this as the key turning point for the American.

In the Gran Premio de España, Andretti finally completed a race, finishing fifth amongst the established front runners. However, his showing was criticized by former McLaren World Champion James Hunt because Andretti was lapped by his teammate Senna.
  
He would finish in the points on three occasions, but he could never quite string things together consistently. He never fully got to grips with the McLaren MP4/8. Highly technical aspects which he was not used to in the technologically simpler Indy cars such as active suspension and traction control hampered Andretti's chances as did the standing starts used in F1. Some in the industry also felt that since he commuted to races and test sessions from the United States, rather than relocating full-time to Europe was also a contributing factor to his lack of success in Formula One. At the time, McLaren's Special Projects Manager, long-time Andretti family friend Tyler Alexander, who had been involved in F1 since the mid-1960s, had urged Michael to relocate to England as he knew times had changed from when Mario had raced to the 1978 World Championship. True enough, he finished third at Monza (which would prove to be his last Formula One race), but with three races remaining, he left the team and the championship by mutual agreement after the race.

According to Michael's son Marco, the McLaren team "sabotaged" his father's chances at being competitive in order to replace him with the team's test driver Mika Häkkinen, who would require a smaller salary. "The reality of it was, they had Mika Häkkinen ready to come in for a lot less than what my dad was getting paid, and that's all it was. Right then and there, they had to make him look [bad]," claimed Marco in 2008. "They would make the car do weird things in the corner electronically, stuff out of his control." However, Andretti still had problems in practice for the Italian Grand Prix, and both he and Senna spun off with brake balance problems early in the race. Andretti was able to continue and fought back up to third, holding off Wendlinger. Throughout the season, Senna experienced similar reliability problems to Andretti, mainly electronic gremlins, particularly in San Marino, Canada, Hungary and Belgium, although Häkkinen equalled Andretti's third place Monza finish in Japan, while Senna won both the Japanese Grand Prix and the season ending Australian Grand Prix, his final race for McLaren. And according to Häkkinen in a much later interview, Andretti’s commuting to Europe from the United States meant he was not in Europe enough when testing needed to be done, allowing Häkkinen to consistently show his speed and build a relationship with the team. Häkkinen had also said that Andretti's mental approach was all wrong, and he did not realize the kind of incredible sacrifices one needed to make in order to succeed in Formula One.

It has also been reported that at the start of the 1993 season, Dennis signed Häkkinen as a backup to Senna, who was initially reluctant to commit to the team for the whole season (Senna's move to Williams had to wait until the next season because his rival Alain Prost was having his retirement season there and had it written into his contract that they could not sign the Brazilian triple World Champion as his teammate). This created a difficult atmosphere for Andretti, who would be in the shadow of the brilliant Brazilian, and also faced the threat of being replaced by Häkkinen.

Return to CART

Andretti returned to the IndyCar racing after his unsuccessful season in Formula One with Target Chip Ganassi Racing, where he once again proved very successful. He went on to win in his very first race back in the series at the 1994 Australian FAI Indycar Grand Prix, around the Surfers Paradise Street Circuit in Queensland, Australia, having led every lap along the way. That win also got Reynard's first win in CART in their debut. Although the season may not have gone the way Michael would have liked, he did win again in the Molson Indy Toronto, taking a record fourth win. By the time he retired, Michael would have won seven times around the Exhibition Place.

In 1995, he returned to Newman/Haas Racing. Taking only one win in Toronto, he had a consistent season, scoring points in every round which resulted in Andretti claiming fourth overall in the points standing. The following season, he would finish as runner-up to Jimmy Vasser, in a season marred by the death of Jeff Krosnoff and split with Indy Racing League, visiting victory lane on five occasions. Newman/Haas began a new relationship with Swift which did not prove to be very successful in 1997-1999. In 2000 the team used Lola chassis and Michael won the Firestone Firehawk 300 held at Twin Ring Motegi in Japan, and again in Toronto.

Michael tried again to win Le Mans in 1997, again alongside Mario, but joined on this occasion by Olivier Grouillard. Following an accident during the night, the trio were forced to retire their Courage C36. Michael would not return to la Sarthe as a driver.

For 2001 he made the decision to move to Team Green as he wanted to try to win the Indianapolis 500 and Newman/Haas refused to enter the Indy Racing League event. Andretti ran in a third Team Green car with Motorola sponsorship and ran at Indianapolis. He led 16 laps, and was leading the race during a rain delay just beyond the halfway point. Had the race been halted due to the rain, he could have been declared the winner. The red flag, however, did not come out at the time and the race resumed. A punctured tyre, and a minor collision in the pits with eventual winner Hélio Castroneves, driving for car owner Roger Penske, slowed him down, and at the end of the day, Andretti settled for 3rd place. In July it was announced that Michael had bought the team and intended to shift the entire operation (which was renamed Andretti Green Racing) to the IRL.

His career in CART ended in 2002, in which he took his 42nd and final career victory at the Toyota Grand Prix of Long Beach - placing him in third place for all-time victories in championship car racing behind his father, Mario Andretti (52 wins) and A. J. Foyt (67 wins).

Andretti is also tied with Al Unser Jr. for the most wins in a CART/IndyCar season with eight victories. He achieved this during his championship-winning season of 1991. Throughout his time in IndyCar, he retained a consistent and impressive record, finishing in the top ten of the championship on 17 occasions.

Semi-retirement and team owner

Andretti entered in the first four IRL events in 2003, culminating with the 2003 Indianapolis 500, after which he retired from full-time IndyCar racing. He led the race for 28 of the opening 94 laps before a throttle linkage failure put him out of contention once again. That year he bought into the "Team Green" squad run by brothers Kim and Barry Green in CART. It became Andretti Green Racing and for 2003, the team moved to the Indy Racing League IndyCar Series.

The team claimed consecutive IndyCar Series titles in 2004 and 2005, with Tony Kanaan and Dan Wheldon respectively, winning 11 of the 17 races, including the Indianapolis 500. The 2007 enhanced the Andretti legacy, when Dario Franchitti captured Andretti Green Racing its third Series title in four seasons, and its second Indianapolis 500 win.

Andretti returned to the driver's seat for the 2006 Indianapolis 500 in a one-time effort to assist the development of his son, Marco, an IndyCar rookie for the 2006 season. Michael led the race with four laps to go, before falling to second behind his son a lap later. He went on to finish third, while Marco only just missed out on the 500 victory after he was passed just before the start/finish line on the last lap by three-time IndyCar champion, Sam Hornish Jr.

After qualifying his car in 11th place for the 2007 Indianapolis 500, Andretti went on to finish 13th. He then announced that this would be his last Indy 500 as a driver. Andretti leaves driving competition at Indy with a frustrating distinction: the driver who led the most laps (431) without winning the race. He competed in 16 Indy 500s, with a top finish of second in 1991, but led the race nine times.

By 2012, racing under the name of Andretti Autosport, they brought the 2012 IndyCar Series championship back home. Michael served not only as the team owners, but as the strategist on Ryan Hunter-Reay's four race victories. Hunter-Reay also captured the 2014 Indianapolis 500, with a close victory over Hélio Castroneves.

At the beginning of 2018, he partnered with Ryan Walkinshaw's Walkinshaw Racing and Zak Brown's United Autosports to create Walkinshaw Andretti United which competes in the Australian Supercars Championship. Andretti United expanded into Extreme E in 2021.

On February 18, 2022, it was announced that Andretti had submitted a request with the FIA to enter Formula 1 under "Andretti Global".

Other activities

In 1996, Andretti invested in a Toyota dealership in his home state of Pennsylvania.

Among his personal appearances, Andretti appeared as a contestant on season 5 of the reality TV series The Celebrity Apprentice, which debuted in February 2012. Andretti joined the show as a last-minute replacement for his son Marco, who dropped out when Marco's friend Dan Wheldon was killed in the 2011 IZOD IndyCar World Championship hours before Apprentice filming was scheduled to begin.  Andretti was fired in the fourth episode, after a presentation for Buick executives of the Buick Verano.

In March 2012, Andretti Sports Marketing took over as promoter of the Milwaukee Mile IndyCar race. The company also promoted the Indy Grand Prix of Louisiana, the Miami ePrix and the Global RallyCross Championship events at Washington and New York.

Personal life

Michael is a member of the Andretti racing family. He is the son of Formula 1, CART and NASCAR racing legend Mario Andretti. His brother Jeff Andretti competed in IndyCar. Michael's uncle Aldo Andretti was an open wheel racer until an accident ended his racing career. Aldo's son, John Andretti (Michael's first cousin), raced in IndyCar before he became a NASCAR regular. He returned to IndyCar in 2007, 2008, 2009, 2010 and 2011, where he raced in the Indy 500. Aldo's other son, Adam, is also a racing driver, and in 2006, Michael's eldest son, Marco, made his debut in the IndyCar Series. The Andretti family became the first family to have five members (Michael, Mario, Marco, Jeff, and John) compete in the same series (CART/Champ Car/IndyCar).

Andretti attended Northampton Community College in Bethlehem, Pennsylvania. Andretti was married to Sandra "Sandy" Spinozzi from November 1985 to 1996 and they had two children, son Marco (born March 13, 1987) and daughter Marissa (born October 31, 1990). He remarried on December 24, 1997 to Leslie Wood. They had a son, Lucca, born September 16, 1999. Andretti officially separated from Leslie in 2003.  On September 7, 2004 Andretti filed for divorce. Two years later on July 15, 2006 Andretti announced his engagement to former Miss Oregon Teen USA 1994, Playboy Playmate of the Year 2000, model and actress Jodi Ann Paterson. The couple were married on October 7, 2006 at the Andretti Winery in Napa Valley, California. They have twin children, Mario and Miati (Mia), born February 13, 2014. The couple resides in Fishers, Indiana.

Awards

Andretti was inducted into National Italian American Sports Hall of Fame in 2002, th Motorsports Hall of Fame of America in 2008, the Long Beach Grand Prix Walk of Fame in 2010, the Canadian Motorsports (International Division) Hall of Fame in 2012, and the Indianapolis Motor Speedway Hall of Fame in 2012.

Racing record

Career highlights

SCCA National Championship Runoffs

Formula One

(key)

Complete 24 Hours of Le Mans results

Complete 24 Hours of Daytona results

Complete 12 Hours of Sebring results

American Open Wheel racing results
(key)

Formula Super Vee

USAC

CART

 (Event)1 : non-championship, exhibition race held day preceding next championship race.

IndyCar Series

Indianapolis 500 results

Further reading

Michael Andretti, Robert Carver & Douglas Carver.  Michael Andretti at Indianapolis . Simon & Schuster.

See also 

 Michael Andretti's World GP, a video game that licensed his name

References

External links 

 The Official Andretti Family Website
 
 Article on Andretti's F1 career
 The Greatest 33

Living people
1962 births
Sportspeople from Bethlehem, Pennsylvania
Racing drivers from Pennsylvania
Indianapolis 500 drivers
Indianapolis 500 Rookies of the Year
American Formula One drivers
McLaren Formula One drivers
Champ Car champions
Champ Car drivers
IndyCar Series drivers
Atlantic Championship drivers
International Race of Champions drivers
World Touring Car Championship drivers
SCCA Formula Super Vee drivers
Formula Super Vee Champions
IndyCar Series team owners
Formula E team owners
24 Hours of Le Mans drivers
24 Hours of Daytona drivers
12 Hours of Sebring drivers
World Sportscar Championship drivers
IMSA GT Championship drivers
A1 Grand Prix team owners
Nazareth Area High School alumni
Michael Mario
SCCA National Championship Runoffs participants
Trans-Am Series drivers
American people of Italian descent
Participants in American reality television series
The Apprentice (franchise) contestants
Newman/Haas Racing drivers
Chip Ganassi Racing drivers
Andretti Autosport drivers
Porsche Motorsports drivers
Sports car racing team owners